The Chengcing Lake Baseball Stadium is a baseball stadium located in Niaosong District, Kaohsiung, Taiwan, on the side of Chengcing Lake. The stadium opened in 1999 and has been the home of Kaohsiung-Pingtung Fala (1999–2002), First Financial Holdings Agan (2003), La New Bears (2004-2010), and EDA Rhinos (2013–2016). The stadium will be the future home for TSG Hawks.

See also
 List of stadiums in Taiwan
 Sport in Taiwan

References

1999 establishments in Taiwan
Baseball venues in Taiwan
Sports venues completed in 1999
Sports venues in Kaohsiung